Church is a large village in Hyndburn, Lancashire, England, situated a mile west of Accrington. The village has a population of 5,186 at the 2011 Census, an increase from 3,990 according to the 2001 census.

History and geography
Church was once a township in the ancient parish of Whalley, covering an area along the eastern side of Hyndburn Brook. Tinker Brook, up to Foxhill Bank, formed the boundary with Oswaldtwistle in the south and Bottom Syke from Dunkenhalgh, the boundary with Clayton-le-Moors to the north. This became a civil parish in 1866.

The parish church is the medieval Church of St James. The tower dates to the late medieval era, and was damaged by a fire in 1983. The nave was constructed in 1805.

As planned the route of the Leeds and Liverpool Canal was to continue up the valley of the River Hyndburn to serve Accrington. However when it was extended from Enfield at the start of 19th-century, the route was altered as the Peel family's textile print works at Church was one of the largest factories in the world and used the river's water during the printing process. Building the embankment for the canal to cross the Hyndburn would have interrupted the water supply. Instead, the canal was built downstream, re-joining the original line at a right angle junction. Most of the land for the  deviation had to be purchased from the Petre family of Dunkenhalgh. Although they supported the canal's construction, they requested that the towpath was made on the opposite side of the canal from the house, hoping this would prevent poachers from gaining easy access to their estate. Church is the halfway point on the Leeds and Liverpool Canal.

The main road running through the village is the A679.

Governance
Prior to 1894 Church had a civil parish, and between 1894 and 1974 the area was administered by an Urban District. It has since become an unparished part of the borough of Hyndburn.

Economy and amenities
Church is a large village with a wealth of amenities, including a supermarket, bakery, bookmaker, sports centre, a fire station and a car sales garage. Another car sales garage was closed down and demolished in 2015, making way for a restaurant. A small library was also once located in the village, but closed in 2006.

Education
Church is home to St Christopher's Church of England High School and St. Nicholas C.E. Primary School.

People

Edward Ormerod or Ormrod (1834-1894) was born in the village of Church. He was the inventor in 1867 of the patent Ormerod Butterfly Clip, which has been responsible for saving the lives of generations of coal miners.

Magdalen Nabb

See also
Listed buildings in Church, Lancashire

References
Notes

Citations

External links

 The Leeds Liverpool Canal in Church www.towpathtreks.co.uk

Villages in Lancashire
Unparished areas in Lancashire
Geography of Hyndburn